Morrin is a village in central Alberta, Canada. It is located 26 km north of the Town of Drumheller, along Highway 27 and the Railink Central Western railway.

The Morrin Bridge Provincial recreation area is located 10 km west of the village, in the Red Deer River valley, and Dry Island Buffalo Jump Provincial Park is located 40 km north.

Morrin was originally named "Blooming Prairie" but was renamed Morrin in honour of the engineer of the first train to the village.

Demographics 

In the 2016 Census of Population conducted by Statistics Canada, the Village of Morrin recorded a population of 240 living in 110 of its 132 total private dwellings, a  change from its 2011 population of 245.

See also 
List of communities in Alberta
List of villages in Alberta

References

External links 

1920 establishments in Alberta
Villages in Alberta